Harmologa petrias is a species of moth of the family Tortricidae. It is found in New Zealand.

The wingspan is about 15 mm. The forewings are fuscous, sprinkled with whitish and markings formed by ochreous irroration (sprinkling), mixed (especially on the edges) with black. The hindwings are rather dark fuscous, but darker terminally.

References

Moths described in 1902
Archipini